Komor Rud (also Romanized as Komor Rūd and Kamar Rūd; also known as Kamarūd, Komor, and Kamar) is a village in Sheykh Fazlolah-e Nuri Rural District, Baladeh District, Nur County, Mazandaran Province, Iran. At the 2006 census, its population was 53, in 20 families.

References 

Populated places in Nur County